Bhandari was an Indian politician from the state of the Madhya Pradesh.
He represented Pal Vidhan Sabha constituency of undivided Madhya Pradesh Legislative Assembly by winning General election of 1957.

References 

Madhya Pradesh MLAs 1957–1962
Year of birth missing
Possibly living people
Indian National Congress politicians from Madhya Pradesh